A Life of Hope (活下去) is a Singaporean drama which aired on Channel 8. It debuted on 21 March 2005 and consists of 20 episodes.

Cast

External links
The Defining Moment on MediaCorp

References

Singapore Chinese dramas
2005 Singaporean television series debuts
2005 Singaporean television series endings
Channel 8 (Singapore) original programming